Tabachnik National Garden is a National Park located on the southern slopes of Mount Scopus in Jerusalem, next to the Hebrew University. The garden preserves some Jewish burial caves from the Second Temple period and two small modern cemeteries, the American Colony Cemetery and the Bentwich Cemetery. Two lookouts are also located within the park, an eastward one facing the Dead Sea and the Judean Desert, and a westward one towards the Temple Mount.

Jerusalem American Colony Cemetery on Mount Scopus

The main cemetery of the American Colony is located here. Another cemetery of the Colony is situated on Mount Zion.

Bentwich Cemetery

A small cemetery beside the American Colony cemetery is dedicated to Herbert Bentwich and his family.

Gallery

External links

Mount Scopus
Archaeological sites in Jerusalem
National parks of Israel